The 130th IOC Session  took place on 11 July 2017 at the SwissTech Convention Centre in Lausanne.

Host city elections
The session authorised the IOC Executive Board to conclude an agreement with Los Angeles and Paris and their respective NOCs for the simultaneous election of the host cities of the Olympic Games 2024 and 2028 during the 131st IOC Session in Lima later in 2017.

See also
 128th IOC Session
 131st IOC Session

References

International Olympic Committee sessions
2017 in Swiss sport
2017 conferences
Sport in Lausanne
2024 Summer Olympics bids
2028 Summer Olympics bids
July 2017 sports events in Europe